In probability, a singular distribution is a probability distribution concentrated on a set of Lebesgue measure zero, where the probability of each point in that set is zero.

Other names
These distributions are sometimes called singular continuous distributions, since their cumulative distribution functions are singular and continuous.

Properties
Such distributions are not absolutely continuous with respect to Lebesgue measure.

A singular distribution is not a discrete probability distribution because each discrete point has a zero probability.  On the other hand, neither does it have a probability density function, since the Lebesgue integral of any such function would be zero.

In general, distributions can be described as a discrete distribution (with a probability mass function), an absolutely continuous distribution (with a probability density), a singular distribution (with neither), or can be decomposed into a mixture of these.

Example
An example is the Cantor distribution; its cumulative distribution function is a devil's staircase. Less curious examples appear in higher dimensions. For example, the upper and lower Fréchet–Hoeffding bounds are singular distributions in two dimensions.

See also
Singular measure
Lebesgue's decomposition theorem

External links
Singular distribution in the Encyclopedia of Mathematics

Types of probability distributions